The Platinum Fashion Mall is a five billion baht (100 million euro) shopping mall in Pratunam, Bangkok, Thailand, which specializes in fashion clothes and accessories retail and wholesale. It is a six-storey complex with an 11-storey condominium building above the complex.

The mall is located on Phetchaburi Road, next to Pantip Plaza and opposite Pratunam Complex, a 14-storey mall. It is also near CentralWorld. Platinum 2, on the grounds next to Platinum 1, was completed in March 2011.

Platinum Fashion Mall consists of 7 floors of shopping floors (named from basement floor- Ginza, Soho, Oxford, Nathan, Camden, Orchard and Food Center).

Floor Directory 

The mall are separated into 3 zones (Zone 1,2&3), and each row of shoplots are clearly marked (to easily navigate around the building). Information Counters are located at each entrances of the mall. ATMs and mobile top-up machines are available everywhere in the mall.

Operating Hours 
 Monday, Tuesday, Thursday & Friday : 09:00 till 20:00
 Saturday, Sunday & Wednesday : 08:00 till 20:00

See also
 List of shopping malls in Bangkok
 List of shopping malls in Thailand

References

External links
Platinum Fashion Mall
Hotels near Platinum Fashion Mall

Shopping malls in Bangkok
Ratchathewi district
Shopping malls established in 2000
2000 establishments in Thailand